Mehler is a German surname that may refer to:

Barry Mehler (born 1947), Jewish-American professor of humanities at Ferris State University
Gustav Ferdinand Mehler (1835–1895), German mathematician
Jacques Mehler, cognitive psychologist specializing in language acquisition
Jay Mehler (born 1971), musician from Philadelphia, United States
Johann Baptist Mehler (died 1930), German Catholic priest, prelate, and religious writer
John Mehler (born 1948), Californian drummer for Love Song, Spirit of Creation, Noah and other bands
Tobias Mehler (born 1976), Canadian actor who has appeared in film and television productions
Bruce Mehler (born 1952), research scientist, Massachusetts Institute of Technology, specializing in human factors research

See also
Mehler function or conical functions, introduced by Gustav Ferdinand Mehler in 1868
Mehler kernel, the propagator of the Hamiltonian for the quantum harmonic oscillator
Mehler reaction, also known as Photorespiration, a process in plant metabolism
Fock-Mehler transform, an integral transform introduced by Mehler (1881) and rediscovered by Fock (1943)
Heine-Mehler formula describes the asymptotic behavior of the Legendre polynomials as the index tends to infinity
Meher (disambiguation)
Mehl
Mehle
Methler